TP Properties is a British company, based in Blackburn, Lancashire, providing supported housing.

The company works with councils, housing associations, registered providers and care companies to provide specialist housing for vulnerable adults.  TP Properties were the originator of the 'Pilling Lane' model of Supported Housing.

Community links
TP Properties sponsors a young local swimmer Niamh Robinson.

References 

Companies based in Blackburn
Housing in England